This is a list of Spanish television related events from 1969.

Events
 14 February - The show El Irreal Madrid, directed by Valerio Lazarov, wins the Golden Nymph Award in the Monte-Carlo Television Festival.
22 February - Salomé is selected to represent Spain at the 1969 Eurovision Song Contest with her song "Vivo cantando". She is selected to be the ninth Spanish Eurovision entry during Festival de la canción española held at Teatro Balear in Palma De Mallorca.
29 March - The 14th Eurovision Song Contest is held at the Teatro Real in Madrid. Spain shared the win of the contest, in a four-way tie with the United Kingdom, the Netherlands and France. Salomé represents Spain, singing Vivo cantando.
 20 July: TVE broadcasts Neil Armstrong's arrival to the moon, commented by Jesús Hermida, Spanish correspondent in New York.
 8 November: Adolfo Suárez is appointed Director General of RTVE.

Debuts

La 1

Television shows

La 1

Ending this year

La 1 
 Edición especial (1963-1969)
 Día de fiesta (1966-1969)
 Mar, ese mundo maravilloso, La (1968-1969)
 Millón para el mejor, Un (1968-1969)
 Noches de Europa (1968-1969)
 Premio, El (1968-1969)

La 2 
 Conozca usted España (1968-1969)
 Escritores en televisión (1968-1969)
 Hilo directo (1968-1969)
 Nuevas gentes (1968-1969)

Foreign series debuts in Spain

Births
 6 February - Arancha de Benito, hostess.
 16 February - Anne Igartiburu, hostess.
 24 February - Fernando Tejero, actor.
 29 March - Alicia Senovilla, hostess.
 30 March - Isabel Serrano, actress.
 13 June - Cayetana Guillén Cuervo, actress and hostess.
 22 June - Ana Risueño, actress.
 23 June - Alberto Chicote, chef and host.
 27 June - Chiqui Fernández, actress.
 27 June - Javier Coronas, comedian.
 9 July - Carlos Leal, actor.
 29 July - Marta Belenguer, actress.
 6 August - Manu Carreño, host.
 26 August - Jorge Sanz, actor.
 25 September - Paz Padilla, comedian, actress and hostess.
 3 October - César Heinrich, host.
 8 October - Susanna Griso, hostess.
 10 October - María Abradelo, hostess.
 12 October - Judit Mascó, modelo and hostess.
 27 October - Samantha Vallejo-Nágera, chef and hostess.
 27 November - Natalia Millán, actress.
 23 December - Secun de la Rosa, actor.
 Silvia Salgado Garrido|Silvia Salgado, hostess.

See also
1969 in Spain
List of Spanish films of 1969

References